The Mid-Peninsula Athletic Conference was an athletic conference for high schools in the Upper Peninsula of Michigan. It was formed in 1976. It was dissolved in 2018, with most of its members joining the Western Peninsula Athletic Conference.

2017 member schools

Former members

Football
This list goes through the 2016 season.

References

Michigan high school sports conferences
High school sports conferences and leagues in the United States
1976 establishments in Michigan